Ritesh Agarwal is a Professor in the Department of Pulmonary Medicine at the Postgraduate Institute of Medical Education and Research, (PGIMER) Chandigarh, having research interests in allergic bronchopulmonary aspergillosis (ABPA). He was awarded the Shanti Swarup Bhatnagar Prize for Science and Technology in Medical Sciences in the year 2020 for his contributions in the field of ABPA.

Ritesh Agarwal has published many research papers exploring the ABPA and novel criteria for the diagnosis and classification of ABPA.

Education
Ritesh Agarwal secured his M.B.B.S. degree in 1998 from Stanley Medical College, Chennai, and completed his Fellowship in pulmonary and critical care medicine from PGIMER in 2004.

Honours and recognitions

Besides the Shanti Swarup Bhatnagar Prize for Science and Technology, Rohit Srivastava has been conferred several awards including the following:

 ICMR Kamal Satbir Award for the year 2009
 NASI-Scopus Young Scientist Award (Medicine category) for the year 2011
 ICMR Shakuntala Amir Chand Award for the year 2012
 ICMR Chaturvedi Ghanshyam Das Jaigopal Memorial Award for the year 2019
 Fellow of the American College of Chest Physicians
 Fellow of Asian Pacific Society of Respirology
 Fellow of Indian Chest Society
 Fellow of Royal College of Physicians of Glasgow.

References

External links

Recipients of the Shanti Swarup Bhatnagar Award in Medical Science
Indian medical writers
Indian medical academics
Indian medical researchers
Year of birth missing (living people)
Living people